In enzymology, a beta-ketoacyl-acyl-carrier-protein synthase I is an enzyme that catalyzes the chemical reaction

an acyl-acyl-carrier-protein + malonyl-acyl-carrier-protein  a 3-oxoacyl-acyl-carrier-protein + CO2 + acyl-carrier-protein

Thus, the two substrates of this enzyme are acyl-acyl-carrier-protein and malonyl-acyl-carrier-protein, whereas its 3 products are 3-oxoacyl-acyl-carrier-protein, CO2, and acyl carrier protein. This enzyme participates in fatty acid biosynthesis.
This enzyme belongs to the family of transferases, specifically those acyltransferases transferring groups other than aminoacyl groups.

Nomenclature 

The systematic name of this enzyme class is acyl-[acyl-carrier-protein]:malonyl-[acyl-carrier-protein] C-acyltransferase (decarboxylating).

Other names in common use include:

 beta-ketoacyl-ACP synthase I,
 beta-ketoacyl synthetase,
 beta-ketoacyl-ACP synthetase,
 beta-ketoacyl-acyl carrier protein synthetase,
 beta-ketoacyl-[acyl carrier protein] synthase,
 beta-ketoacylsynthase,
 condensing enzyme (CE),
 3-ketoacyl-acyl carrier protein synthase,
 fatty acid condensing enzyme,
 acyl-malonyl(acyl-carrier-protein)-condensing enzyme,
 acyl-malonyl acyl carrier protein-condensing enzyme,
 beta-ketoacyl acyl carrier protein synthase,
 3-oxoacyl-[acyl-carrier-protein] synthase,
 3-oxoacyl:ACP synthase I,
 KASI,
 KAS I,
 FabF1, and
 FabB.

References

 
 
 
 
 
 
 Neidhardt, F.C. (Ed.), Escherichia coli and Salmonella: Cellular and Molecular Biology, 2nd ed., vol. 1, ASM Press, Washington, DC, 1996, p. 612-636.

EC 2.3.1
Enzymes of known structure